Maharaja Hastin was a feudatory of the Gupta Dynasty and a member and ruler of the Parivrajaka dynasty. He is known from the Khoh copper plate land grant, records a land grant of a village to certain brahmanas by him.

References

Indian maharajas
4th-century births
Year of birth missing